This is a discography listing of releases by Scottish recording artist, Leon Jackson, winner of The X Factor (UK) in 2007. His debut single, "When You Believe" was released in December 2007, and sold 490,000 copies in the United Kingdom alone, and was certified a Gold status by the BPI. His second single, "Don't Call This Love" was released a week prior to the release of his debut album, Right Now (2008) which was later certified Gold by the BPI in the UK for sales of over 130,000 copies.

Following the success of the single "Don't Call this Love", Jackson went onto release the single "Creative", performing the single live on the official BBC Children in Need 2008 show performing the song as an "exclusive" as this was the first time Jackson had performed the track. The song went on to debut at number 94 on the UK Singles Chart.

In recent years, Jackson has turned his hand mostly to songwriting, having credit for writing tracks for a number of artists, most notably writing alongside British recording artist Vince Kidd on the song "Sick Love", released in 2012.

Albums

Studio albums

Singles

As lead artist

Music videos

Songwriting credits
 Vince Kidd - "Sick Love" (2012)

References

Discographies of British artists